Larry Heard (born May 31, 1960) is an American DJ, record producer, and musician who has recorded under various names, most notably Mr. Fingers. He is widely known as a pioneering figure in 1980s house music, and was leader of the influential group Fingers Inc., whose 1988 album Another Side was the first long-form house LP. He is regarded as a progenitor of the deep house subgenre, bridging the gap between the futurism of house and the lush sound of disco. His landmark 1986 single "Can You Feel It" would be a major influence on dance music.

Early life
Born on the South Side of Atlanta, Heard grew up hearing jazz and Motown at home, and could play several instruments from a young age. Before beginning his solo musical career in 1983, he was the drummer, at the age of 17, in the band Infinity (a jazz fusion cover group that included Adonis). He is sometimes cited as having been a member of the Manhattan Transfer, but Heard has denied this, saying, "[I] filled in for somebody on one show." He also worked for the US government as a benefit authorizer, which enabled him to buy his first pieces of studio equipment.

Musical career
Heard began producing music in 1984 after purchasing a synthesizer and drum machine; after a few days with the gear, he had recorded three tracks that would later be regarded as landmarks of house music: "Can You Feel It", "Mystery of Love", and "Washing Machine." Despite initially not having a connection to Chicago's club scene, he eventually met singer and DJ Robert Owens at a party and the two formed the group Fingers Inc. along with Ron Wilson. The group would release the LP Another Side in 1988. Around this time, Heard also began releasing solo singles as Mr. Fingers on Trax Records and DJ International. At the end of the decade, Trax released Ammnesia (1989), which compiled Heard's early tracks; it was released without Heard's permission. Heard reissued the album in 2022 on his own Alleviated label, marking its first authorized release.

In 1989, Heard contributed to the debut album by producer Lil' Louis. In the early 1990s, he recorded with Harry Dennis as the It before setting out on his own, signing with MCA Records as a solo act in 1991 and releasing his first official Mr. Fingers album Introduction in 1992 to international success. After the label interfered with his Mr. Fingers follow-up, he released the less dance-oriented album Sceneries Not Songs, Vol. 1 in 1995 under his given name. He continued to record intermittently in the following years, and released the Mr. Fingers album Cerebral Hemispheres in 2018. Much of Heard's music has been released and re-released under different names, including Loosefingers, Fingers, House Factors, and Trio Zero.

In 2003, a man known as Larry "The Count" Heard was used as the model for one of the citizen characters in Half-Life 2. It is currently unclear if this is the same Larry Heard, but it is unlikely due to geographic constraints (Heard never lived in Seattle), and as "The Count" is not listed as an alias on his more exhaustive Discogs.com page.

Discography

as Mr. Fingers

Studio albums 
Ammnesia (1989)
 Introduction (1992)
 Back to Love (1994)
 Cerebral Hemispheres (2018)
 Around the Sun, Pt.1 (2022)

Compilations
Classic Fingers (1995)

EPs 

 6 Tack E.P. (1988)
 Mr. Fingers 2 (1991)

Singles 

 "Mystery of Love" (1985)
 "Washing Machine" (1986)
 "Slam Dance" (1987)
 "What About This Love" (1989)
 "Ammnesia" (1989) 
 "Love and Juice" (1989) 
 "Closer" (1992)
 "On My Way" (1992) 
 "On a Corner Called Jazz" (1992)
 "Dead End Alley" (1992) 
 "I Need You" (1994)

as Larry Heard

Studio albums

 Sceneries Not Songs Volume One (1994)
 Sceneries Not Songs Volume Tu (1995)
 Alien (1996)
 Dance 2000 (1997)
 Dance 2000 Part 2 (1998)
 Genesis (1999)
 Love's Arrival (2001)
 Where Life Begins (2003)
 Loose Fingers: Soundtrack from the Duality Double-Play (2005)

EPs
 The Calm & Chaos EP (1997)
 Dance 2000: The Glasgow Connection (1998)
 Dance 2000: The Chicago Connection (1999)
 25 Years from Alpha (2008)
 Distance Revisited EP (2012)

Singles
 "Black Oceans" (1994)
 "Missing You" (2000)
 "Direct Drive" / "Time Machine" (2001)
 "Another Night (Re-Edit)" (2001)
 "Praise" (2002)
 "Space Jungle" (2003)
 "Reminisce" (2003)
 "Evening Dance" (2003)

References

External links
 Alleviated Records
 

1960 births
Living people
Remixers
African-American DJs
Musicians from Chicago
DJs from Chicago
American dance musicians
MCA Records artists
American house musicians
Deep house musicians
21st-century African-American people
20th-century African-American people
Electronic dance music DJs